Oleg Miron (born: 21 January 1956) is a sailor from Hrodna, USSR who represented his country at the 1988 Summer Olympics in Busan, South Korea as a crew member in the Soling. With helmsman Georgy Shayduko and fellow crew member Nikolay Polyakov they finished in 10th place.

References

Living people
1956 births
Sailors at the 1988 Summer Olympics – Soling
Olympic sailors of the Soviet Union
Soviet male sailors (sport)